Simon Cockrell (1745-1835) was an American Baptist minister and politician from Virginia.

Early life
Simon Cockrell was born in 1745.

Career
In 1780, he was allowed to preach the Baptist faith in Washington County, Virginia, when the official religion was the Church of England, as the Colony of Virginia was part of the British Empire until 1788. By 1782, he was given a license to marry in the same county.

He served as a member of the Virginia House of Delegates from 1791 to 1793, and again from 1798 to 1800.

Death
He died in 1835 in Jackson County, Missouri, where he was buried.

References

1745 births
1835 deaths
People from Washington County, Virginia
People from Jackson County, Missouri
Baptist ministers from the United States
Members of the Virginia House of Delegates
Baptists from Virginia